Mykhaylo Nikiforovich Chornyi (November 26, 1933) is a Ukrainian Realist, Neo-Primitivist) painter and graphic artist. Chornyi is described as "the founder of Ukrainian Neo-Folk Style". A member of Ukrainian National Artists' Union since 1968.
People's Artist of Ukraine (2003).

Education, career 
Mykhaylo Chornyi studied art from 1956 to 1961 at Odessa State Art College n.a. M. Grekov, and same year he entered Kyiv Art Institute (nowadays The National Academy of Fine Arts and Architecture, which graduated with a Master's Degree in Fine Arts in 1968 (professors: Mykhaylo Khmelko and Victor Shatalin. 
At the post-graduate school in Soviet Academy of Arts he studied in Sergey Grigoriev's and Mykhaylo Deregus's workshop. 

He transformed the Socialist realism artistic manner he was taught through a Ukrainian academic romanticism and historicism, rare at that time of Soviet censorship and pressure, to a new folk artistic style.

Awards 
 I Prize at The All-Union Arkhip Kuindzhi Contest(1973)
 I Prize at The Nikolai Trublaini Contest (1976)
 National Artist of Ukraine (People's Artist of Ukraine)(2003)

Exhibitions 
Mykhaylo Chornyi has more than 50 personal exhibitions of paintings and graphics all over former Soviet Union and throughout nowadays Ukraine.

Collections 
His works are in possession of Soviet Ministry of Culture, Ukrainian Ministry of Culture, leading Ukrainian State museums, in private collections of Australia, Austria, Canada, France, Germany, Greece, Hungary, Israel, Poland, Russia, Slovakia, Spain, USA, as well as Ukraine.
Mykhaylo Chornyi is noted in "The Artists of The World": A Bio-bibliographical Index A to Z. (Munich: K. G. Saur (publisher)), 1996.

External links 
 http://vinspilka.narod.ru/mut/chor/chor.html
 
 Вінницька ОО НСХУ

Ukrainian painters
Ukrainian male painters
Ukrainian genre painters
Soviet artists
1933 births
Living people